John Roxborough may refer to:
 John Roxborough (academic administrator), master of University College, Oxford
 John Roxborough (boxing manager), American bookmaker, boxing manager and sports gambler

See also
 John Roxburgh (disambiguation)
 John Roxborough Norman, English ichthyologist